Nykvist is a surname of Swedish origin.  It may refer to:

 Ann-Christin Nykvist (born 1948), a Swedish politician
 Jens Nykvist (born 1968), a Swedish Navy rear admiral
 Sven Nykvist (1922–2006), a Swedish cinematographer

See also

 Nyquist (disambiguation)

Swedish-language surnames